Ribeira Grande may refer to the following places:

Cape Verde
Ribeira Grande (stream), a stream on the island of Santo Antão
Ribeira Grande, Cape Verde, a town on the island of Santo Antão
Ribeira Grande, Cape Verde (municipality), a municipality on the island of Santo Antão
Ribeira Grande de Santiago, Cape Verde, a municipality on the island of Santiago

Portugal
Ribeira Grande (Azores), a municipality on the island of São Miguel, Azores